Events in the year 1740 in Norway.

Incumbents
Monarch: Christian VI

Events

Construction of Kongsberg Church was initiated.

Deaths
18 February – Barthold Nicolai Landsberg, military officer (born c.1668).

See also

References